Kenneth Solomon (born 13 June 1934) is a South African cricketer. He played in three first-class matches for Border in 1958/59.

See also
 List of Border representative cricketers

References

External links
 

1934 births
Living people
South African cricketers
Border cricketers
Cricketers from Johannesburg